Tongjiao Temple is a Buddhist temple located in Dongcheng District of Beijing. Now it is the only Bhikkhuni temple in Beijing. It was inscribed to the National Key Buddhist Temples in Han Chinese Area's list in 1983.

History
Tongjiao Temple was first established by an eunuch in the Ming dynasty (1368–1644), the modern temple was founded in the Qing dynasty (1644–1911) and initially called "Tongjiao Chanlin", and it served as a practice center for Bhikkhuni.

At the dawn of the Republic of China (1912-1949), the temple became dilapidated for neglect. In 1941, there only had a Bhikkhuni named Yinhe. In 1942, eminent Bhikkhuni Cizhou's disciples Kaihui, Tongyuan and Shengyu began to rebuild the temple. The South Hall, North Hall, Recitation Hall, Wuguan Hall were added to the temple. And the temple was renamed "Tongjiao Temple". They founded "Bajing Xueyuan", a Buddhist school which became well-known at that time.

In 1956, in order to avoid the vigorous movement of socialism in Beijing at that time, Kaihui and Tongyuan moved to Mount Wutai, where Kaihui died there in the mid-1960s.

During the Cultural Revolution, the Red Guards had attacked the temple. Buddhist statues and Buddhist scriptures were destroyed and Bhikkhuni forced to resume secular life.

After the 3rd Plenary Session of the 11th Central Committee of the Chinese Communist Party, according to the national policy of free religious belief, Tongjiao Temple was reopened and rebuilt soon.

In 1983, Tongjiao Temple was listed among the first group of the National Key Buddhist Temple in Han Chinese Area by the State Council of China.

In January 1984, Tongjiao Temple was categorized as a municipal level key cultural heritage in Beijing.

Architecture
Tongjiao Temple has more than 10 buildings. The complex includes the following halls: Shanmen, Mahavira Hall, Hall of Sangharama Palace, Reception Hall, Dining Hall, Hall of Guru, and Bedrooms.

References

External links

Dongcheng District, Beijing
Buddhist temples in Beijing
Tourist attractions in Beijing
15th-century Buddhist temples
15th-century establishments in China